is a railway station on the Tadami Line in the town of Aizumisato, Fukushima Prefecture, Japan, operated by East Japan Railway Company (JR East).

Lines

Station layout
Aizu-Takada Station has one side platform serving a single bi-directional track. The station is unattended.

History
The station was absorbed into the JR East network upon the privatization of the JNR on April 1, 1987. A new station building was completed in January 2000.

Surrounding area
Isasumi Shrine
 former AizuTakada Town Hall
 Aizu-Misato Police Station
Aizu Takada Post Office
 Onuma Prefectural High School

 Fukushima Prefectural Route 22
 Fukushima Prefectural Route 53
 Fukushima Prefectural Route 130
 Fukushima Prefectural Route 152
 Fukushima Prefectural Route 220

See also
 List of railway stations in Japan

References

External links

 JR East Station information 

Railway stations in Fukushima Prefecture
Tadami Line
Railway stations in Japan opened in 1926
Stations of East Japan Railway Company
Aizumisato, Fukushima